This is a list of clubs that play Australian rules football in Australia at the senior level.
Guide to abbreviations: 
FC - Football Club
AFC - Australian Football Club (mainly used if in Queensland or NSW or outside Australia) / Amateur Football Club (mainly used in the other Australian States)
ARFC - Australian Rules Football Club

State Level

Northern Territory Football League

Metropolitan / Country Level

NTFL reserves (formerly Top End Australian Football Association)

Banks Football Club
Jabiru Football Club
Pint Football Club
Tracy Village Football Club
University Football Club (NTFL)

Barkly Australian Football League

Ali Curung Football Club
Arlparra Football Club
Canteen Creek Football Club
Eagles Football Club
Epenarra Football Club
Marla Football Club
Spitfires Football Club
Willowra Football Club

Central Australian Football League

Anmatjere Football Club
Federals Football Club
Hermannsburg Football Club
Ltyentye Apurte Football Club
MacDonnell Districts Football Club
Pioneers Football Club
Rovers Football Club (CAFL)
South Football Club
Wests Football Club
Yuendumu Football Club

Gove Australian Football League

Baywarra Football Club
Djarrak Football Club
Gapuwiyak Football Club
Gopu Football Club
Nguykal Football Club

Big Rivers Australian Football League

Division 1
Arnhem Crows Football Club
Beswick Football Club
Katherine Football Club
Lajamanu Football Club
Ngukurr Football Club
Numbulwar Football Club
Division 2
Jilkminggan Football Club
Kalano Football Club
Kalkarindgi Football Club
Katherine Roos Football Club
Minyerri Football Club
Tindal Magpies Football Club

Tiwi Islands Football League

Imalu Football Club
Muluwurri Football Club
Pumarali Football Club
Ranku Football Club
Tapalinga Football Club
Tuyu Football Club
Walama Football Club

Australia clubs
 
Football clubs